Tylldalen Church is a parish church of the Church of Norway in Tynset Municipality in Innlandet county, Norway. It is located in the village of Tylldalen. It is the church for the Tylldalen parish which is part of the Nord-Østerdal prosti (deanery) in the Diocese of Hamar. The white, wooden church was built in a long church design in 1736 using plans drawn up by the architect Karl Brandvold. The church seats about 240 people.

History
The first church in Tylldalen was a wooden church, possibly a stave church, that was built during the 12th century. It was fairly quickly replaced by a new and larger church on the same site, perhaps in the first half of the 1200s. Around the year 1381, the church was torn down and replaced with a new building. In 1598, the old church was torn down and replaced with a new timber-framed building.

This church was built around 1660 and lasted until 1733 when it was torn down and replaced with a new building on the same site. Karl Brandvold and son Arne were hired to design and build the new church. The new building was consecrated on 2 March 1736 by the Bishop of Oslo, Peder Hersleb.

Media gallery

See also
List of churches in Hamar

References

Tynset
Churches in Innlandet
Long churches in Norway
Wooden churches in Norway
18th-century Church of Norway church buildings
Churches completed in 1736
12th-century establishments in Norway